Peravai may refer to:

Aathi Thamilar Peravai, people's movement founded by Adhiyamaan in 1994 in Tamil Nadu, India
Congress Jananayaka Peravai (Congress Democratic Front), political party in the Indian state of Tamil Nadu
Dravida Peravai (Dravidian Front), political party in Pondicherry, India
Kumari Arivial Peravai, voluntary group doing service in the field of science and technology in Kanyakumari district, India